RS Public Company Limited the pioneer and has been the inspiration of Thai entertainment culture since 1982. Today, RS GROUP is categorized in the commerce sector in the Stock Exchange of Thailand. Its core business categories are commerce business and media and entertainment business. The commerce business includes RS Mall and Lifestar Co., Ltd., while the media and entertainment business includes Thai television Channel 8, COOLISM radio station, and RS Music. The enterprise is operated under the model so-called Entertainmerce, maneuvering the business from upstream to downstream. That is to say, the strength of the media and entertainment business is drawn out to support the commerce business. This model incorporates all the subsidiaries conclusively and promotes the growth of all subsidiaries at the same time.

History
Mr. Kriengkai Chetchotisak began his own business in the field of jukebox production and cassette-tape recording, before formally founding "Rose Sound Co., Ltd.", which was the first milestone of the "RS Group", with only 50,000 Baht capital.

In 1982, R.S. Sound Co. Ltd. was established, with Kriengkai deciding to target the teenage demographic profile. The first band signed to the fledgling record label was Intanin, followed by Kiriboon, Fruity, Sixth Sense, Brandy and Rainbow.

By 1992, R.S. Promotion 1992 had moved its office from a small building on Urupong Rd. to the "Chetchotisak" building on Soi Ladprao 15 with 300 million Baht capital. Apart from recording albums, it has expanded into other entertainment lines: movie, radio program, TV program and TV series. The company established the R.S. Star Club, the first music fan club in Thailand.

In 1997, R.S. Promotion 1992 expanded into the TV industry by founding Shadow Entertainment Co., and Magic Advertainment Co., Ltd to produce "Shock Game", a talk of the town games show. This was followed by variety shows, music programs, music videos and TV series that gave the company both financial performance and reputation.

In 1999, R.S. Promotion entered the radio industry by setting up a new company called "Sky-High Network Co., Ltd" which operated 2 radio stations, "98 Cool FM" and "88.5 Z Pop We Like".

In May 2003, the company was listed on the Stock Exchange of Thailand as R.S. Promotion Public Company Limited.

In 2006, the company changed its name from "R.S. Promotion Public Company Limited" to "RS Public Company Limited" and changed its corporate identity to be consistent with the overall image of the organization. The celebration campaign was designed under the main theme of "a journey of happiness".
The company invested 50% in RS International Broadcasting and Sport Management Co., Ltd to expand into the sport business. The company was granted the media rights to the World Cup tournament in 2010 and 2014.

In 2008, the company invested in Yaak Co., Ltd to expand into the TV media business, targeting the teen segment. Yaak's TV programs include Teen Plus Show, Kamikaze' Club, 2 Nite Live and teen drama, Daddy Duo. The company invested about 60 Million in an indoor seven-a-side soccer field called "S-One", located on Bangna-Trad Km.4 road. The soccer field serves as a rental field as well as a media to sponsors targeting sport marketing. The company was granted the media rights to the live broadcasts of the 2008 Euro Football Championship.

In 2009, the Company started the satellite TV business with 2 channels; "YOU Channel" and "Sabaidee TV", which were first broadcast in August 2009 to more than 4.5 million households.

In 2011, the company expanded its satellite TV business by managing 2 channels; "Channel 8", free TV variety 24 hours, and "Yaak TV", free TV uncensored 24 hours.
The company was granted the media rights to the live broadcasts of the 2012–13 La Liga football tournament.

In 2012, the company expanded its satellite TV, by launching the new channel "RS Sport La Liga" to support the right to broadcast Spanish La Liga football for the three seasons 2012–15. The company also has modified "Yaak TV" by adjusting the content and format to cover all target groups and renamed to "Star Max Channel" with the concept "entertainment variety for star lovers".
In the radio business, the company broadcast FM 88.5 MHz "Sabaidee Radio" Thai country music station that built on the success of Sabaidee TV and R-Siam.

In 2013, the Company entered into a full entertainment production which focuses on the media business. This year, the company has modified "RS Sport La Liga" into a semi-pay TV "Sun Channel La Liga" that includes sports, news entertainment and Spanish La Liga football.
In the radio business, the company rebranded "Sky High" to "COOLISM" and opened a new radio channel "COOL Celsius 91.5". The station offers international music, variety programmes and content from overseas.

In 2014, the Company won the Digital TV auction and broadcast Channel 8 as Digital Free TV with standard definition. The company also rebranded "Starmax Channel" to "Channel 2", to build it into the No.1 of satellite TV in Thailand.

Businesses

RS Music
There are eight recording labels under RS Music, covering Thai pop (string) and Thai country music (luk thung) as well as rock, hip hop, rhythm and blues and easy listening. The labels are Yes! Music, Garden, Kamikaze, R-siam, Mingset Mob, The Demo and CHO.

Artists
Among the artists with RS Music are:

RS Television
RS Public Company Limited operates Digital TV Channel 8 and 4 leading satellite television channels.

Channel 8 is operated under the concept of "Your Friend Everywhere, TV for Everyone" which presents its works to serve demands for all age and gender groups of audiences by producing and creating all forms of entertainment varieties. The concept is similar to other free television channels which consists of variety of programs with its strength during the prime time period for new television drama with its first run. Channel 8 is broadcast via Digital TV No.27 and Satellite TV No.8 and 37 in C Band, KU Band and the local Cable TV around the country.

Channel 2 is the first complete  star variety in Thailand. This is the only station that gathers top variety shows from artists, actors, celebrities, and leading local and foreign artists in full. Additionally, popular contents have been arranged to be broadcast 24 hours in order to serve the target group.

Sabaidee TV channel focuses on the target group with appreciation of Thai songs not only limited to country music but also included songs for life, hit songs in the past, rare-to-hear old songs, string music, including underground music market where a music maker is given an opportunity to promote their work, under the slogan "various Thai style music, happy watching for the whole family".

YOU Channel  the channel with program concept of "Television for Music Lovers" which consists of various programs such as live programs of variety favors and variety programs that are interesting to follow.

Sun Channel La Liga is a new channel under the "Extreme Entertainment Variety" concept that consists of sport, news, information, and entertainment programs. Main target group consists of people in their early working lives, and the adult group who love sport. The new channel emphasizes life broadcasting of the La Liga Spanish football in order to serve the audience group who love football.

RS Mall 
RS Mall is the platform for serving a broad range of products and services that enhance good health and longevity, which are certified with the standard of Food and Drug Administration (FDA).

Lifestar 
Lifestar (Lifestar Co., Ltd.) is a world-class innovators of health and beauty products that aim at solving health and beauty problems with the most effective products and global standard quality.

RS Radio
The radio stations are composed of 3 different target groups.

COOL Fahrenheit is a radio station operated by RS GROUP. COOLfahrenheit is well-known for easy-listening music. The radio station has been topping the Thai rating chart for up to 20 years and ranked number 1 for the online audience in Asia. The station broadcasts Thai music on FM 93 around the clock, on the website, and the COOLISM application.

COOL Celsius 91.5 The station offers International Music and Variety Programmes in both Thai and English. COOL Celsius 91.5 formerly used a "Killer Content" Strategy with programming such as American Top 40, hosted by Ryan Seacrest (discontinued in late 2014).

Sabaidee Radio F.M. 88.5 presents with variety of Thai music i.e. country music, country for life music, country music with southern and northern accent, north-eastern music style, Mor-Lum, oldies string music, and including country pop music with the aim for easy listening, and popular to all members of the family. The radio frequency is widely and overwhelmingly accepted from audiences as its programs create good humor atmosphere among listeners similar to its name as "Sabaidee Radio, the new alternative radio frequency that creates smile and well-being families". All songs have been selected from chart listed song hits with top download volume, and including decent materials to create good humor and well- being to families at all times.

Music industry 
RS Music makes a new challenging step in the music industry by operating three production houses: RoseSound, Kamikaze, and RSIAM. Now, RS Music is offering various genres of music that every generation can appreciate. The new business model, so-called Music Star Commerce, is introduced to add more value to the artists, which agrees with the current core business of RS GROUP.

RS Film
RS Film is the company's film-production and distribution arm. Associated production marques include Avant and Film Surf. In addition to making Thai films, the company also distributes films for exhibition in Thailand. Films produced by the company include:
 Ahingsa-Jikko mee gam
 Bangkok Loco
 Killer Tattoo
 Noodle Boxer
 Ruk Jung
 The Victim
 Gunner

RS Sports
An organizer and broadcaster of sporting events. Currently, RS is a media rights licensee to broadcast the World Cup in 2010 and 2014, the Spanish Football League "La Liga".

See also
 List of record labels
 Media of Thailand

References

 Stock Exchange of Thailand  – To find company information, enter stock symbol RS in the search field.
 Therdthammakun, Arada and Jittapong, Khettiya. March 30, 2006. Thai music firm sees turnaround in 2006, Reuters (retrieved October 4, 2006).
 Investor Relations Information: IR Home Page, Milestones.

External links

 
Mass media companies of Thailand
Film production companies of Thailand
Thai record labels
Record labels established in 1976
Companies listed on the Stock Exchange of Thailand
1976 establishments in Thailand